Zila Ghaziabad is 2013 Indian Hindi-language political action thriller film directed by Anand Kumar. It is produced by Vinod Bachan, and presented by Mohammed Fasih & Bharat Shah. The film features Sanjay Dutt, Vivek Oberoi, Arshad Warsi, Charmy Kaur, Minissha Lamba, Ravi Kishan, Paresh Rawal and Sunil Grover in lead roles amongst others. The film also featured Shriya Saran and Geeta Basra for a special appearance . It was based on true story of gang wars of Ghaziabad. It was released on 22 February 2013. Upon release, the film received mixed reviews.

A full-blown gang war comes to life in the district of Ghaziabad with the rise of the rivalry between gangsters Fauji and Satbir. A corrupt policeman, Pritam Singh, is sent down to set things right.

The film is based on the true story of the gang war that lasted between two groups in the 80s and 90s in Ghaziabad, India.

Synopsis
In the town of Ghaziabad, Brahmapal Choudhary (Paresh Rawal) is a corrupt chairman, and has connections with the gangster Fauji (Arshad Warsi), who is willing to do anything to make a quick buck. When Brahmapal refuses to pay up to 2 million for Fauji's sisters wedding, Fauji breaks their ties and leaves him. At the same time, Brahmapal befriends a polite teacher named Satbir (Vivek Oberoi) who also happens to be in a relationship with Brahmapal's daughter Suman (Charmy Kaur).

Thinking that Brahmapal has replaced him with Satbir, Fauji becomes furious and joins forces with Rashid (Ravi Kishan), a politician and Brahmapal's rivalry.

Cast

 Sanjay Dutt as Inspector Thakur Pritam Singh
 Arshad Warsi as Mahendra Fauji Baisla
 Vivek Oberoi as Satbir Baisla Gurjar
 Ashutosh Kaushik as Pandit
 Ravi Kishan as Rashid
 Charmy Kaur as Suman Chaudhary
 Sunil Grover as Faqira
 Paresh Rawal as Chairman Jagmal Baisla
 Minissha Lamba as Kavita, Fauji's girlfriend
 Chandrachur Singh as Karambir Singh
 Ashutosh Rana as Sangram Singh
 Zarina Wahab as Satbir's mother
 Eijaz Khan as Ombir Singh
 Parth Sharma as Robin Singh
 Geeta Khanna as Rashid's mother
 Divya Dutta as Mahenderi
 Raju Mavani as Sadhu Singh
 Khushboo Kamal
 Shriya Saran in "Chamiya No 1" item number (cameo appearance)

 Geeta Basra in "Baap ka Maal" item number (cameo appearance)

Music
 
The soundtrack of Zila Ghaziabad is composed by Amjad Nadeem, with Bappa Lahiri, son of famous music composer Bappi Lahiri composing "Tu Hain Rab Mera" and "Chamiya No. 1", which initially titled as "Main Item No.1 Hoon". The album contains five tracks. Lyrics by Shabbir Ahmed.

Reception 
Zila Ghaziabad received negative reviews from critics. Roshni Devi from Koimoi gave it 2 star and called it "almost entirely bad" except Arshad Warsi's and Sanjay Dutt acting and a few sequences. Taran Adarsh from Bollywood Hungama gave it 2.5 stars.

References

External links
 

2013 films
2013 action thriller films
2013 crime action films
2010s Hindi-language films
2013 masala films
Indian films about revenge
Indian action thriller films
Political action films
Indian films based on actual events
Action films based on actual events
Indian crime action films
Indian gangster films
Films set in Uttar Pradesh